Words of Peace and Truth was a Hebrew work produced by the Jewish scholar Naphtali Herz Wessely, an associate of Moses Mendelssohn and a prominent figure of the Haskalah.

Published in 1782, the tract aimed to encourage Central European Jewry to accept the Edict of Toleration issued by Emperor Joseph II of Austria, which sought to promote a greater degree of acculturation and secularization among the Jewish community.   The text was geared particularly toward Rabbinic leadership.

Wessely wished to convince the Rabbinic authorities that the spread of secular education would be to the benefit of the Jewish community, and was not something that they should fear.   He essentially differentiated between two different kinds of knowledge: Torat Ha-Elohim (divine, or religious knowledge) and Torat Ha-Adam (human, or secular knowledge).  While both components are necessary, Wessely argued that the acquisition of secular education must precede the acquisition of divine knowledge; ultimately, secular learning is a universal body of knowledge which is to be supplemented by the religious instruction of the Torah.

In many ways, Wessely's reprioritization of education was contrary to traditional Jewish practice.  The study of secular subjects first and the Torah second seemed repugnant to many rabbis, who denounced the work in harsh terms.  In Vilna, the book was burned publicly; however in Italy and other places, it was applauded as an enlightened and legitimate work.

References
 The Moses Complex in Modern Jewish Literature

Age of Enlightenment
Jewish Austrian history
Judaism-related controversies